Salix chaenomeloides is a species of willow native to Japan, Korea, and China. It is a deciduous tree, reaching a height of 10–20 m.

External links

References 

chaenomeloides
Flora of Japan